Sydney Goodfellow (6 July 1915 – 1998) was an English footballer. He made 303 league appearances in the Football League either side of World War II.

He began his professional career with Port Vale in 1936, and also played for Glentoran and Rochdale before the outbreak of the war in 1939. He signed with Chesterfield after the war, before joining Doncaster Rovers in 1948. He helped the club to the Third Division North title in 1949–50. After this success he spent two years with Oldham Athletic, before seeing out his Football League career at Accrington Stanley in 1953. He later turned out for non-league sides Wellington Town, Stafford Rangers, and Oswestry Town, before emigrating to Australia in 1961.

Career
Goodfellow played for Staffordshire non-league sides Hanley and Silverdale before joining Port Vale as an amateur in October 1936, signing professional forms in November that year. He played fourteen consecutive games, scoring just the one goal before losing his place in January 1937. He played a further two games without scoring before leaving on a free transfer in April 1937, having scored one goal in sixteen Third Division North games in 1936–37.

He moved on to Glentoran in Northern Ireland for the 1937–38 campaign, before returning to England to sign with Rochdale. He played 41 of "Dale's" 42 Third Division North games in 1938–39, before his career was interrupted by World War II. After the war, he joined Chesterfield, then a Second Division side led by Bob Brocklebank. The "Spireites" posted a fourth-place finish in 1946–47, before falling down the table in 1947–48. Goodfellow played 80 league games for the club, before he switched to Third Division North side Doncaster Rovers in May 1948.

At Doncaster he was "part of formidable Half Back line with Syd Bycroft and Dave Miller". He played 33 games in 1948–49 and made 38 appearances in 1949–50, as "Donny" won promotion as the division's champions. He then moved on to Oldham Athletic in the Third Division North, making 72 league appearances in the 1950–51 and 1951–52 campaigns. Following, this he played 28 games under Walter Crook at Accrington Stanley in 1952–53. Stanley finished bottom of the Football League, and Goodfellow left Peel Park for non-league Wellington Town. He later played for Stafford Rangers and Oswestry Town. He emigrated to Australia in 1961.

Career statistics
Source:

Honours
Doncaster Rovers
Football League Third Division North: 1949–50

References

1915 births
1998 deaths
People from Wolstanton
English footballers
Association football forwards
Port Vale F.C. players
Glentoran F.C. players
Rochdale A.F.C. players
Chesterfield F.C. players
Doncaster Rovers F.C. players
Oldham Athletic A.F.C. players
Accrington Stanley F.C. (1891) players
Telford United F.C. players
Stafford Rangers F.C. players
Oswestry Town F.C. players
English expatriates in Australia
English Football League players
NIFL Premiership players